The Dominican Republic Olympic Committee (COLIMDO) is the organization that represents Dominican athletes in the International Olympic Committee (IOC) and the Pan American Games.

The Dominican Republic Olympic Committee is headquartered in Santo Domingo, Dominican Republic. The organization is currently directed by Luis Mejía Oviedo.

See also
 Dominican Republic at the Olympics

References

External links 
 Dominican Republic at Olympic.org

National Olympic Committees
Dominican Republic at the Olympics
Olympics
1946 establishments in the Dominican Republic
Sports organizations established in 1946